4-MeO-DMT (4-methoxy-N,N-dimethyltryptamine) is a tryptamine derivative which has some central activity in animal tests similar to that of related psychedelic tryptamine drugs, although with significantly lower potency than either 5-MeO-DMT or 4-hydroxy-DMT (psilocin).

Legality 

In the United States 4-MeO-DMT is a Schedule 1 controlled substance as a positional isomer of 5-MeO-DMT.

See also
4-Acetoxy-DMT
Alexander Shulgin
4-MeO-MiPT

References 

Serotonin receptor agonists
Tryptamines
Indole ethers at the benzene ring
Methoxy compounds
Dimethylamino compounds